Ashfaq Ahmed (born 22 April 1987) is a Pakistani first-class cricketer who plays for Peshawar. In April 2018, he was named in Punjab's squad for the 2018 Pakistan Cup. In September 2019, he was named in Khyber Pakhtunkhwa's squad for the 2019–20 Quaid-e-Azam Trophy tournament.

References

External links
 

1987 births
Living people
Pakistani cricketers
Peshawar cricketers
People from Charsadda District, Pakistan